Keramin Minsk (Belar. Керамин-Минск) was an ice hockey team from Minsk, Belarus. They played in the Belarusian Extraleague until 2010 where the team disbanded due to financial reasons.

History
The club was created in 1998 under the name HC Minsk. In 2001, the club changed name to Keramin Minsk. In 2008 they signed an affiliation to be a feeder club for Dinamo Minsk, who play in the Kontinental Hockey League. 

On 10 July 2010 it was announced that the team was asking the players to start looking for a new club. Six days later the owners announced the dissolution of the club due to financial reasons.

Honours
 Belarusian Extraleague:
  2002, 2008.
  Eastern European Hockey League:
  2003, 2004.
 Belarusian Cup:
  2002, 2008.

References

External links 
 Official site

Ice hockey teams in Belarus
Eastern European Hockey League teams
Belarusian Extraleague teams
Sport in Minsk
1998 establishments in Belarus
2010 disestablishments in Belarus
Defunct ice hockey teams in Europe